Abdulaziz bin Bandar Al Saud (born 1961) is a Saudi royal and businessman who was assistant intelligence chief from 2004 to 2012.

Early life
Prince Abdulaziz was born in Riyadh in 1961. His father is Bandar bin Abdulaziz, son of King Abdulaziz.

Career
Abdulaziz bin Bandar was named assistant intelligence chief in 2004 and promoted to the position of deputy intelligence chief at the Saudi intelligence agency in 2010. He was an assistant to Prince Muqrin bin Abdulaziz who was the head of the agency. Yousef bin Ali Al Idrisi replaced him in October 2012. Abdulaziz has several business activities.

Personal life
One of his sons, Talal bin Abdulaziz, married Sarah bint Fahd on 26 May 2011. She is the daughter of Fahd bin Salman who was the eldest son of King Salman. Their marriage ceremony was held in Marbella on 2 July 2011.

References

20th-century Saudi Arabian businesspeople
21st-century Saudi Arabian businesspeople
1961 births
Living people
Abdulaziz